XHMAX-FM is a radio station on 102.5 FM in Los Mochis, Sinaloa. It is owned by Grupo Chávez Radio and carries a grupera format known as La Maxi.

History
XHMCS-FM received its concession on August 6, 1993. It changed its calls to XHMAX when it became known as Maxi Radio.

The station was later affiliated with Ke Buena until August 2021, when Grupo Chávez Radio terminated its agreement with Radiópolis and dropped the Los 40 and Ke Buena franchises from its stations.

References

Radio stations in Sinaloa